Narendra Kumar (1979–2012) was an Indian Police Service officer.

Early life
Narendra Kumar was born in year 1979. He did his master's degree in Economics from Aligarh Muslim University before deciding to try for civil services examination. His Father Keshav Dev is a sub-inspector posted in Aligarh. His Father in Law S.P. Singh works for Delhi Police.

Career
Narendra Kumar joined IPS in 2009, he was posted in Bihar and Ujjain before joining office in Morena, Madhya Pradesh in early 2012. He was posted in Morena in Madhya Pradesh and was killed allegedly by members of the sand mining mafia in March 2012.

Murder
Murder of a senior Indian police official by the mining mafia created a debate on Corruption in India. Several activists including Anna Hazare were protesting against the incident. CBI probe was ordered by the Indian central government in the issue. He was run over by tractor carrying illegally mined stones after he tried to stop it. Kumar's wife, Madhurani Tewatia is an Indian Administrative Service officer posted in Gwalior, and was on maternity leave at the time of Kumar's death.

See also
 Illegal mining in India
 Corruption in India
 Indian Administrative Service

References

1979 births
2012 deaths
Indian Police Service officers
Indian whistleblowers
Male murder victims
Morena
Illegal mining in India
Aligarh Muslim University alumni
Crime in Madhya Pradesh